Ishmurzino (İşmırźa) is a rural locality (a selo) and the administrative centre of Ishmurzinsky Selsoviet, Baymaksky District, Bashkortostan, Russia. The population was 806 as of 2010. There are 11 streets.

Geography 
Ishmurzino is located 22 km southwest of Baymak (the district's administrative centre) by road. Bogachyovo and Verkhnemambetovo are the nearest rural localities.

References 

Rural localities in Baymaksky District